Nadja Awad (born 1991) is a Swedish politician. She was elected as Member of the Riksdag in September 2022. She represents the constituency of Örebro County. She is affiliated with the Left Party.

References 

Living people
1991 births
Place of birth missing (living people)
21st-century Swedish politicians
21st-century Swedish women politicians
Members of the Riksdag 2022–2026
Members of the Riksdag from the Left Party (Sweden)
Women members of the Riksdag